Bad Sex is an  American reality television series airing on Logo. The series follows  10 diverse participants undergoing a two-month program with sex specialist Chris Donaghue. The participants are male and female, gay and hetero, range in age from 20 to forty-years-old. They attend a group therapy session with issues ranging from dangerous promiscuity to clinical frigidity, from violent sex addiction to compulsive public sex. Under his supervision in the sex therapy group program they'll finally address their deep-rooted issues around sex, infidelity, trust, relational intimacy and sexual addiction.

Cast
Season 1:
 Chris Donaghue - A sex specialist based in Los Angeles, California.
 Ryan
 Joel
 Aaron 
 Ted 
 Kaitie
 Matt
 Chris
 Stella
 Erin

Season 2:
 Chris Donaghue
 Alex
 Courtney
 Tyler 
 Moniesha
 Aaron
 Ian
 Jennifer
 Vince
 Joe
 Jay

Episodes

Season 1

Season 2

References

External links
 
 Chris Donaghue official website
 Bad Sex on Amazon Video™

2011 American television series debuts
Logo TV original programming
2010s American reality television series
2010s American LGBT-related television series
2010s LGBT-related reality television series
American LGBT-related reality television series